Christian Morales (born January 14, 1988) is a Puerto Rican male acrobatic gymnast. Along with his partner, Kevin Garcia Maldonado, he competed in the 2014 Acrobatic Gymnastics World Championships.

References

1988 births
Living people
People from Bayamón, Puerto Rico
Puerto Rican acrobatic gymnasts
Male acrobatic gymnasts
Place of birth missing (living people)